is a town located in Okhotsk Subprefecture, Hokkaido, Japan.

As of February 2021, the town has an estimated population of 8,474. The total area is 505.74 km2.

History
On October 1, 2009, the town of Kamiyūbetsu was merged into Yūbetsu; both are in Monbetsu District, Okhotsk Subprefecture.

Climate

Mascots

They are mischievous tulip siblings who lived in the Kamiyubetsu Tulip Park.
Tupit is a kikomachi tulip. He is 12 years old. He likes onsens and is a very good table tennis player.
Lip-chan is a jacqueline tulip. She is 10 years old and Tupit's younger sister. She is a good reader and is good at studying the benefits of massage therapy.

Sister Cities
Yūbetsu has been twinned with Whitecourt, Alberta, Canada, since 1998.

References

External links

Official Website 

Towns in Hokkaido